Santeri Väänänen (born 1 January 2002) is a Finnish football player who plays as a midfielder for Eliteserien club Rosenborg.

References

2002 births
Living people
Finnish footballers
Finland youth international footballers
Finland under-21 international footballers
Finland international footballers
Helsingin Jalkapalloklubi players
Veikkausliiga players
Rosenborg BK players

Finnish expatriate footballers
Expatriate footballers in Norway
Finnish expatriate sportspeople in Norway
Association football midfielders